The 1909 South Sydney season was the 2nd in the club's history. Captained by primarily by Arthur Conlin, the club competed in the New South Wales Rugby Football League Premiership (NSWRFL), finishing the season repeating as Australian rugby league premiers.

Ladder

Fixtures

Regular season

Finals

Statistics

References 

South Sydney Rabbitohs seasons
South Sydney Rabbitohs season